The Rifle Main Post Office, at Railroad Avenue and Fourth Street in Rifle, Colorado, United States, was built in 1940. It includes a New Deal mural. It was listed on the National Register of Historic Places in 1986.

Description

The building's design, generally Classical Revival and with Colonial Revival details, is credited to Louis A. Simon.

The mural mounted above the Postmaster's office door, titled "Colorado Landscape", was painted on canvas in 1942 by artist George Vander Sluis (1915-1984).

An information sheet posted below the mural reports that Sluis based the painting on sketches near Rifle, but that it does not depict any specific scene.

See also

 National Register of Historic Places listings in Garfield County, Colorado
 List of United States post office murals

References

External links

National Register of Historic Places in Garfield County, Colorado
Colonial Revival architecture in Colorado
Government buildings completed in 1940
Post office buildings on the National Register of Historic Places in Colorado